Fänrik ( in the Swedish Army/Air Force, Acting sub-lieutenant in the Navy) is a company grade officer rank. In the army/airforce, it ranks above sergeant and below lieutenant. In the navy, it ranks above sergeant and below sub-lieutenant.

Army/Air Force/Navy

 (second lieutenant) is a rank in the Swedish Army, Swedish Air Force and in the Swedish Navy (Coastal Artillery 1902–2000, Amphibious Corps 2000–present).

History
The  would have s position and salary benefits but be appointed by Warrant of Appointment.

The question was re-examined by the 1924 Non-Commissioned Officer Expert Investigation, whose proposal (SOU 1925:7) essentially corresponded with the above-mentioned committee opinion, however, that sergeants should not be given a higher rank. General Order No. 1806/1925 regulated for the army the position of non-commissioned officers in accordance with guidelines issued by the Minister of Defence (Bill 1925:50).

In the 1983 reform, the meaning of the term officer broadened to include all professional and reserve military personnel.  was subsequently set to be the lowest rank for professional and reserve military personnel. To be employed as an officer in the Swedish Armed Forces, the candidate was required to complete two years of Officers College (OHS). The objective of the 2009 reform was to produce officers who are specialized at commanding troops at platoon, company and higher level as well as providing officers of academic status.

Promotion
According to Chapter 2, Section 1 of FFS 2018:7, a person who is eligible for promotion has served in the Swedish Armed Forces to such an extent that assessment of suitability, knowledge and skills could be carried out, is deemed suitable for promotion, possesses the knowledge and skills required for the higher rank, and meets time requirements according to Section 2 (must have held the rank for at least two years). After having passed the Career Officer Programme, the cadet will be promoted to second lieutenant and be posted to a job. For promotion from second lieutenant to lieutenant may take place if the second lieutenant holds an academic degree at the undergraduate level. A second lieutenant who has completed the Swedish Armed Forces' pilot training with an approved result may be promoted to lieutenant without holding an academic degree at the undergraduate level. In the case of reserve officers, promotion of second lieutenant to lieutenant may take place if the second lieutenant holds an academic degree at the undergraduate level, or at least 180 higher education credits if the program comprises more higher education credits than 180.

Uniform

Collar patches

Shoulder marks

Air Force

Army

Navy (Amphibious Corps)

Sleeve insignias

Air Force

Navy (Amphibious Corps)

Hats

Navy

 (acting sub-lieutenant) is a rank in the Swedish Navy.

Duties
During the acting sub-lieutenant's first two years, his specialization – profiling will begin/continue towards the intended focus/trade/function. This specialization is determined by the unit according to the unit's specific needs for competence. The content of this period shall form a basis for developing the abilities described in order to be promoted to sub-lieutenant. The acting sub-lieutenant should be supervised during this period. Positions during this period are e.g. platoon commander, operator positions on board a ship.

Promotion
According to Chapter 2, Section 1 of FFS 2018:7, a person who is eligible for promotion has served in the Swedish Armed Forces to such an extent that assessment of suitability, knowledge and skills could be carried out, is deemed suitable for promotion, possesses the knowledge and skills required for the higher rank, and meets time requirements according to Section 2 (must have held the rank for at least two years). After having passed the Career Officer Programme, the cadet will be promoted to acting sub-lieutenant and be posted to a job. For promotion from acting sub-lieutenant to sub-lieutenant may take place if the acting sub-lieutenant holds an academic degree at the undergraduate level. An acting sub-lieutenant who has completed the Swedish Armed Forces' pilot training with an approved result may be promoted to sub-lieutenant without holding an academic degree at the undergraduate level. In the case of reserve officers, promotion of acting sub-lieutenant to sub-lieutenant may take place if the acting sub-lieutenant holds an academic degree at the undergraduate level, or at least 180 higher education credits if the program comprises more higher education credits than 180.

Uniform

Shoulder marks
The top galloon is shaped like a "loop" for an officer in the Swedish Navy (the loop is shaped like a "grenade" for an officer in the Swedish Amphibious Corps). The rank insignia is worn on the shoulder mark to jacket and coat, as well as to blue wool sweater, trench coat, sea coat (black raincoat and to white shirt. Rank insignia on shoulder mark is worn on all garments with shoulder straps.

1. The shoulder mark is designed as galloons sewn directly to another shoulder mark.

2. The woven shoulder mark is worn on the naval combat dress, duty uniform and combat uniform ((green, beige and blue)).

Sleeve insignias
Rank insignia is worn on both sleeves for inner suit jacket and mess jacket.

1. On the sleeve an 12,6 mm rank insignia and galloon. The distance between galloons should be 6 mm. The distance from the bottom edge of the sleeve to the bottom edge of the top galloon should be 100 mm.

Hats

Peaked cap
An acting sub-lieutenant wears a peaked cap which is fitted with a hat badge and with a lacing in form of a golden thread.

Side cap and winter hat
An officer wears a hat badge for the navy and another for amphibious units on the side cap and on the winter hat.

Epaulette
An acting sub-lieutenant wears epaulette's to white tie and to coat. On the epaulette, an acting sub-lieutenant wears 2 mm fringes in two rows.

Footnotes

References

Notes

Print

Web

Military ranks of the Swedish Army
Military ranks of the Swedish Air Force
Military ranks of the Swedish Navy

sv:Fänrik